Paulo Lira de Oliveira, best known as Paulo Diniz (24 January 1940 – 22 June 2022), was a Brazilian singer and composer.

Biography
Born in Pesqueira, Diniz started his career at 12 years old as a radio announcer. In 1964 he moved to Rio de Janeiro to work at Rádio Tupi as an announcer and sports commentator.

Diniz began his professional career as a singer in 1966, when he was put under contract by the record label  and released his first single, "O chorão". In the 1970s he got his major hits, such as "Um chope pra distrair", "Bahia comigo" and "Quero voltar pra Bahia". His most successful composition was "Pingos de amor", a song written together with Odibar Moreira da Silva and originally released in 1971, which was later covered by prominent artists such as Kid Abelha, Sula Miranda and Neguinho da Beija-Flor. He was also well-known for his musical adaptations of Brazilian poems, notably "E agora José", based on a poem by Carlos Drummond de Andrade,  "Vou me embora pra Pasárgada", from a poem by Manuel Bandeira, and  "Definição do amor" by Gregório de Matos. 

Starting from the 1980s Diniz slowed his career as he suffered several health issues, notably schistosomiasis, which caused a paralysis of the lower limbs and forced him to use a wheelchair.  He died of natural causes in his Recife home on 22 June 2022, at the age of 82.

Discography    
Albums
 Brasil -  Brasa -  Braseiro -  1967
 Quero Voltar Pra Bahia -  1970
 Paulo Diniz -  1971
  E agora -  José? -  1972
 Lugar Comum -  1973
  Paulo Diniz -  1974
 Paulo Diniz - 1975
  Estradas -  1976
  É Marca Ferrada -  1978
 Canção do Exílio -  1984
 Pegou de Jeito -  1985
 20 super sucessos-novas regravações -  1997
 Reviravolta -  2004

References

External links 
  
 

1940 births
2022 deaths
Brazilian male singers
Brazilian male composers
Música Popular Brasileira singers
People from Pernambuco